Eremocoris fenestratus is a species of dirt-colored seed bug in the family Rhyparochromidae, found in the Palearctic.

References

External links

 

Rhyparochromidae
Palearctic insects
Insects described in 1939